Amsacta albistriga, the red hairy caterpillar, is a moth of the  family Erebidae. It is found in southern India, where it has been recorded feeding on finger millet and sorghum.

The larvae defoliate various agricultural crops. After about thirty to forty days of feeding the larvae burrow into the soil to pupate.

References

External links
Species info

Spilosomina
Moths described in 1865
Moths of Asia
Insect pests of millets